Backflip may refer to:

 Backflip (acrobatic)
 "Backflip" (song), a song by Raven-Symoné from her album This Is My Time
 Backflip Studios, a video game publisher
 Motorola Backflip, a mobile phone
 Backflip!!, Japanese sports anime television series